Pedro Ricardo Salgado González (born 6 November 1992), is a Chilean former footballer who played as a defender.

Career
He played on the Chilean U20 team in the 2011 South American championship.

He was loaned by Universidad Católica to Deportes Temuco. Recovering from an injury, his loan was not registered in time to play the first half of the 2013 season with Temuco.

After not getting over a pubalgia, he retired at the age of twenty-two.

Personal life
He got a degree in construction engineering.

Honours
 Universidad Católica
 Copa Chile: 2011

References

External links

UC profile

1992 births
Living people
People from Cautín Province
Chilean footballers
Chilean expatriate footballers
Chile under-20 international footballers
Chilean Primera División players
Club Deportivo Universidad Católica footballers
Segunda División Profesional de Chile players
Primera B de Chile players
Deportes Temuco footballers
Chilean expatriate sportspeople in England
Expatriate footballers in England
Association football defenders